The former Central Magistracy is located at 1, Arbuthnot Road, Central, Victoria, Hong Kong. It was constructed from 1913 to 1914.

History
The site where the building is standing was originally occupied by the first Hong Kong Magistracy. The former building was probably erected in 1847 but was later demolished to make way for the present building. Difficulty and delay in the construction work was caused because of the provision of an extensive basement in the new magistracy. The Central Magistracy was closed in 1979 and was subsequently used by different associations affiliated to the Hong Kong Police Force.

Architecture
The building's majestic appearance, with the imposing pillars of the façade and other features in the Greek-revival style, are lost to its poor exposure fronting onto a steep, narrow road. The massive retaining walls were constructed with granite blocks.

Conservation
The former Central Magistracy has been redeveloped into a cultural and shopping destination generally called Tai Kwun. Tai Kwun is composed of three declared monuments: the former Central Police Station, former Central Magistracy and Victoria Prison.

See also
 Central and Western Heritage Trail
 Former French Mission Building
 Legislative Council Building

External links

 Antiquities and Monuments Office 

Central, Hong Kong
Declared monuments of Hong Kong
Former courthouses
Government buildings completed in 1914
Government buildings in Hong Kong
Hong Kong Police Force
Landmarks in Hong Kong